Ishitubba Creek is a stream in the U.S. state of Mississippi. It is a tributary to North Tippah Creek.

Ishitubba  is a name derived from the Choctaw language meaning "the one who takes and kills".

References

Rivers of Mississippi
Rivers of Tippah County, Mississippi
Mississippi placenames of Native American origin